The Beechworth Correctional Centre is a minimum security prison, located in Beechworth, Victoria, Australia. It was opened in January 2005 as a replacement for the now-closed HM Prison Beechworth.

Accommodation in the prison is made up of several self-catered and fully catered units. Prisoners in self-catered units are given a weekly budget (currently $27.00) to buy groceries and cook their own meals.

The prisoners work in a variety of areas, including landcare work, factory work, billet positions, and kitchen jobs, as well as several education options.

Like other minimum security prisons, the Beechworth Correctional Centre has a zero tolerance policy on drugs. Any prisoner who tests positive for drugs is moved into a punishment cell and moved to a higher security prison.

Notable prisoners 
 Glenn Wheatleymusic entrepreneur, sentenced for tax evasion

References

External links 
 Official Site (archived)

Prisons in Victoria (Australia)
Beechworth
2005 establishments in Australia